Joe Ellis Brown (May 24, 1933 – January 7, 2018) was an American schoolteacher and politician.

Born in Anderson County, South Carolina, to Prue Ellis and Elouise Grant-Brown, he played football at Allen University and obtained a master's degree at South Carolina State University. He was named principal of Hopkins High School in 1957. Richland County School District One later made Brown principal of Hopkins Junior High, until he retired in 1985. A Democrat, Brown was a member of the South Carolina House of Representatives for district 73 from 1986 to 2006.

References

1933 births
2018 deaths
Democratic Party members of the South Carolina House of Representatives
African-American schoolteachers
Schoolteachers from South Carolina
People from Anderson County, South Carolina
South Carolina State University alumni
Allen Yellow Jackets football players
African-American state legislators in South Carolina
20th-century African-American people
21st-century African-American people